Nándor Németh (born 19 November 1999) is a Hungarian swimmer. He competed in the men's 4 × 100 metre freestyle relay event at the 2017 World Aquatics Championships.

Major Results

Individual

Relay

References

1999 births
Living people
Hungarian male swimmers
Hungarian male freestyle swimmers
World Aquatics Championships medalists in swimming
European Aquatics Championships medalists in swimming
Swimmers at the 2020 Summer Olympics
Olympic swimmers of Hungary
Sportspeople from Somogy County
20th-century Hungarian people
21st-century Hungarian people